Pediasia is a genus of small moths in the family Crambidae. They are widespread across temperate Eurasia and adjacent regions.

Despite this genus being proposed as early as 1825, it was not widely recognized until the mid-20th century. Consequently, most species were initially placed in the closely related genus Crambus.

Species

 Pediasia abbreviatellus (Walker, 1866)
 Pediasia abnaki (Klots, 1942)
 Pediasia alaica (Rebel, 1907)
 Pediasia alcmena Błeszyński, 1965
 Pediasia altaica (Staudinger, 1899)
 Pediasia amandusella Błeszyński, 1969
 Pediasia aridalis (Hampson, 1900)
 Pediasia aridella
 Pediasia aridelloides Błeszyński, 1965
 Pediasia batangensis (Caradja, 1939)
 Pediasia bizonelloides Błeszyński, 1966
 Pediasia bizonellus (Hampson, 1896)
 Pediasia bolivarella (Schmidt, 1930)
 Pediasia browerella (Klots, 1942)
 Pediasia cistites (Meyrick, 1934)
 Pediasia contaminella (Hübner, 1796)
 Pediasia desertella (Lederer, 1855)
 Pediasia dolicanthia
 Pediasia dorsipunctella (Kearfott, 1908)
 Pediasia echinulatia
 Pediasia ematheudellus (de Joannis, 1927)
 Pediasia epineura (Meyrick, 1883)
 Pediasia ericella (Barnes & McDunnough, 1918)
 Pediasia fascelinella
 Pediasia ferruginea Błeszyński, 1963
 Pediasia figuratellus (Walker, 1866)
 Pediasia fulvitinctellus (Hampson, 1896)

 Pediasia georgella Kosakjewitsch, 1978
 Pediasia gertlerae Błeszyński, 1969
 Pediasia gregori Roesler, 1975
 Pediasia gruberella Błeszyński, 1969
 Pediasia hispanica Błeszyński, 1956
 Pediasia huebneri Błeszyński, 1954
 Pediasia jecondica Błeszyński, 1965
 Pediasia jucundella (Herrich-Schäffer, [1847])
 Pediasia kuldjaensis (Caradja, 1916)
 Pediasia laciniella (Grote, 1880)
 Pediasia lederei Błeszyński, 1954
 Pediasia lidiella Streltzov & Ustjuzhanin, 2009
 Pediasia lucrecia Błeszyński, 1969
 Pediasia luteella (Denis & Schiffermüller, 1775)
 Pediasia matricella (Treitschke, 1832)
 Pediasia melanerges (Hampson, 1919)
 Pediasia mexicana Błeszyński, 1967
 Pediasia naumanni Błeszyński, 1969
 Pediasia nephelostictus (de Joannis, 1927)
 Pediasia niobe Błeszyński, 1962
 Pediasia numidella (Rebel, 1903)
 Pediasia ochristrigella (Hampson, 1896)
 Pediasia palmitiella (Chrétien, 1915)
 Pediasia paraniobe Błeszyński, 1969
 Pediasia pectinicornis (Rebel, 1910)

 Pediasia pedriolella (Duponchel, 1836)
 Pediasia persella (Toll, 1947)
 Pediasia perselloides
 Pediasia phrygius
 Pediasia pseudopersella Błeszyński, 1959
 Pediasia pudibundella (Herrich-Schäffer, [1852])
 Pediasia radicivitta (Filipjev, 1927)
 Pediasia ramexita Błeszyński, 1965
 Pediasia ribbeella (Caradja, 1910)
 Pediasia roesleri Błeszyński, 1969
 Pediasia rotundiprojecta W. Li & H. Li, 2011
 Pediasia sajanella (Caradja, 1925)
 Pediasia scolopendra Błeszyński, 1969
 Pediasia serraticornis (Hampson, 1900)
 Pediasia siculella
 Pediasia simiensis Błeszyński, 1962
 Pediasia steppicolella (Zerny, 1914)
 Pediasia strenua Bassi, 1992
 Pediasia subepineura Błeszyński, 1954
 Pediasia subflavella (Duponchel, 1836)
 Pediasia torikurai Sasaki, 2011
 Pediasia trisecta (Walker, 1856)
 Pediasia truncatella (Zetterstedt, 1839)
 Pediasia walkeri Błeszyński, 1962
 Pediasia wittei Błeszyński, 1969
 Pediasia yangtseella (Caradja, 1939)
 Pediasia zellerella (Staudinger, 1899)

Footnotes

References

External links

Crambini
Crambidae genera
Taxa named by Jacob Hübner